Jonas Björkman and Todd Woodbridge were the defending champions and successfully defended their title, defeating Jacco Eltingh and Paul Haarhuis in the final, 4−6, 6−3, [10−6].

Draw

Final

Group A

Group B

References
Senior Gentlemen's Invitation Doubles

Men's Senior Invitation Doubles